The Mycenaean palace amphora with octopus in the National Archaeological Museum of Athens (NAMA) with inventory number Π 6725 is dated to the 15th century BC. It was found in the second grave of the Mycenaean cemetery at Prosymna, near Argos.

It is a three-handled amphora, which belongs to the category of the so-called Palace amphorae, which arrived in the Greek mainland in the Late Helladic II and was heavily influenced by Minoan palace amphorae. It is decorated with a sea-themed scene, with rocks, seaweed, and three large octopuses, whose long tentacles wind around the whole vase. The work is attributed to a Mycenaean vase painter who was working entirely within the tradition of "Marine Style" Cretan Minoan vase painting.

References

External links 
 Image on the "Digital Collection" of the Greek Ministry for Culture and Sport

Archaeological discoveries in Greece
Amphorae
National Archaeological Museum, Athens
Mycenaean art
Argos, Peloponnese
Minoan vase painting